The Savoia-Marchetti S.65 was an Italian racing seaplane built for the 1929 Schneider Trophy race.

Design and development
The S.65 was a single-seat twin-engine floatplane of low-wing monoplane configuration with two floats.  Its tailplane was supported by two booms and the floats, which extended well toward the rear of the aircraft. Its two 745-kilowatt (1,000-horsepower) Isotta Fraschini engines were mounted in tandem, each driving a two-bladed propeller, one in the nose in a tractor configuration and the other at the rear of the fuselage in a pusher configuration.

Operational history

The S.65 was excluded from the 1929 race due to mechanical problems, and Italy was instead represented in the race by one Macchi M.52R and two Macchi M.67 seaplanes.

Tommaso Dal Molin of the Italian Schneider Trophy racing team was killed flying the S.65 during training at Lake Garda in northern Italy on January 18, 1930.

Operators

Specifications

See also

Notes

References

Vašiček, Radko. "When Seaplanes Ruled the Sky." Aviation History, September 2002.
Schneider Trophy History

S.65
1920s Italian sport aircraft
Floatplanes
Schneider Trophy
Racing aircraft
Twin-engined push-pull aircraft
Twin-boom aircraft
Low-wing aircraft
Aircraft first flown in 1929